P. amseli may refer to:

 Parapsectris amseli, a twirler moth
 Photedes amseli, an owlet moth
 Phyllonorycter amseli, a leaf miner
 Protancylis amseli, a tortrix moth